Environmentally sustainable design (also called environmentally conscious design, eco-design, etc.) is the philosophy of designing physical objects, the built environment, and services to comply with the principles of ecological sustainability  and also aimed at improving the health and comfortability of occupants in a building.
Sustainable design seeks to reduce negative impacts on the environment, the health and well-being of building occupants, thereby improving building performance. The basic objectives of sustainability are to reduce the consumption of non-renewable resources, minimize waste, and create healthy, productive environments.

Theory
The sustainable design intends to "eliminate negative environmental impact through skillful sensitive design". Manifestations of sustainable design require renewable resources and innovation to impact the environment minimally, and connect people with the natural environment.

“Human beings don't have a pollution problem; they have a design problem. If humans were to devise products, tools, furniture, homes, factories, and cities more intelligently from the start, they wouldn't even need to think in terms of waste, contamination, or scarcity. Good design would allow for abundance, endless reuse, and pleasure.”  - The Upcycle by authors Michael Braungart and William McDonough, 2013.

Design-related decisions are happening everywhere daily, impacting “sustainable development” or provisioning for the needs of future generations of life on earth. Sustainability and design are intimately linked. Quite simply, our future is designed. The term “design” is here used to refer to practices applied to the making of products, services, as well as business and innovation strategies — all of which inform sustainability. Sustainability can be thought of as the property of continuance; that is, what is sustainable can be continued.

Conceptual problems

Diminishing returns
The principle that all directions of progress run out, ending with diminishing returns, is evident in the typical 'S' curve of the technology life cycle and in the useful life of any system as discussed in industrial ecology and life cycle assessment.  Diminishing returns are the result of reaching natural limits.  Common business management practice is to read diminishing returns in any direction of effort as an indication of diminishing opportunity, the potential for accelerating decline, and a signal to seek new opportunities elsewhere. (see also: law of diminishing returns, marginal utility, and Jevons paradox.)

Unsustainable investment
A problem arises when the limits of a resource are hard to see, so increasing investment in response to diminishing returns may seem profitable as in the Tragedy of the Commons, but may lead to a collapse.  This problem of increasing investment in diminishing resources has also been studied as a cause of civilization collapse by Joseph Tainter among others. This natural error in investment policy contributed to the collapse of both the Roman and Mayan, among others. Relieving over-stressed resources requires reducing pressure on them, not continually increasing it whether more efficiently or not.

Negative Effects of Waste

The designer is responsible for choices that place a demand on natural resources, produce waste, and potentially cause irreversible ecosystem damage.

About 80 million tonnes of waste in total are generated in the U.K. alone, for example, each year. And concerning only household waste, between 1991–92 and 2007–08, each person in England generated an average of 1.35 pounds of waste per day.

Experience has now shown that there is no completely safe method of waste disposal. All forms of disposal have negative effects on the environment, public innovation, and local economies. Landfills have contaminated drinking water. Garbage burned in incinerators has poisoned air, soil, and water. The majority of water treatment systems change the local ecology. Attempts to control or manage wastes after they are produced fail to eliminate environmental impacts.

The toxic components of household products pose serious health risks and aggravate the trash problem. In the U.S., about seven pounds in every ton of household garbage contains toxic materials, such as heavy metals like nickel, lead, cadmium, and mercury from batteries, and organic compounds found in pesticides and consumer products, such as air freshener sprays, nail polish, cleaners, and other products. When burned or buried, toxic materials also pose a serious threat to public health and the environment.

The only way to avoid environmental harm from waste is to prevent its generation. Pollution prevention means changing the way activities are conducted and eliminating the source of the problem. It does not mean doing without, but doing differently. For example, preventing waste pollution from litter caused by disposable beverage containers does not mean doing without beverages; it just means using refillable bottles.

Industrial designer Victor Papanek has stated that when we design and plan things to be discarded, we exercise insufficient care in design.

Waste prevention strategies
In planning for facilities, a comprehensive design strategy is needed for preventing the generation of solid waste. A good garbage prevention strategy would require that everything brought into a facility is recycled for reuse or recycled back into the environment through biodegradation. This would mean a greater reliance on natural materials or products that are compatible with the environment.

Any resource-related development is going to have two basic sources of solid waste — materials purchased and used by the facility and those brought into the facility by visitors. The following waste prevention strategies apply to both, although different approaches will be needed for implementation:

 use products that minimize waste and are nontoxic
 compost or anaerobically digest biodegradable wastes
 reuse materials onsite or collect suitable materials for offsite recycling
 consuming fewer resources means creating less waste, therefore it reduces the impact on the environment.

Climate change

Perhaps the most obvious and overshadowing driver of environmentally conscious sustainable design can be attributed to global warming and climate change. The sense of urgency that now prevails for humanity to take action against climate change has increased manifold in the past thirty years. Climate change can be attributed to several faults, and improper design that doesn't take into consideration the environment is one of them. While several steps in the field of sustainability have begun, most products, industries, and buildings still consume a lot of energy and create a lot of pollution.

Loss of Biodiversity

Unsustainable environment design, or simply design, also affects the biodiversity of a region. Improper design of transport highways forces thousands of animals to move further into forest boundaries. Poorly designed hydrothermal dams affect the mating cycle and indirectly, the numbers of local fish.

Sustainable design principles

While the practical application varies among disciplines, some common principles are as follows:
 Low-impact materials: choose non-toxic, sustainably produced, or recycled materials that require little energy to process
 Energy efficiency: use manufacturing processes and produce products that require less energy
 Emotionally durable design: reducing consumption and waste of resources by increasing the durability of relationships between people and products, through design
 Design for reuse and recycling: "Products, processes, and systems should be designed for performance in a commercial 'afterlife'."
 Targeted durability, not immortality, should be a design goal.
 Material diversity in multicomponent products should be minimized to promote disassembly and value retention.
 Design impact measures for total carbon footprint and life-cycle assessment for any resource used are increasingly required and available.^ Many are complex, but some give quick and accurate whole-earth estimates of impacts.
 Sustainable design standards and project design guides are also increasingly available and are vigorously being developed by a wide array of private organizations and individuals.  There is also a large body of new methods emerging from the rapid development of what has become known as 'sustainability science' promoted by a wide variety of educational and governmental institutions.
 Biomimicry: "redesigning industrial systems on biological lines ... enabling the constant reuse of materials in continuous closed cycles..."
 Service substitution: shifting the mode of consumption from personal ownership of products to provision of services that provide similar functions, e.g., from a private automobile to a carsharing service. Such a system promotes minimal resource use per unit of consumption (e.g., per trip driven).
 Renewable resource: materials should come from nearby (local or bioregional), sustainably managed renewable sources that can be composted when their usefulness has been exhausted.

Bill of Rights for the Planet
A model of the new design principles necessary for sustainability is exemplified by the "Bill of Rights for the Planet" or "Hannover Principles" -  developed by William McDonough Architects for EXPO 2000 that was held in Hannover, Germany. 
 The Bill of Rights:
 Insist on the right of humanity and nature to co-exist in healthy, supportive, diverse, and sustainable conditions.
 Recognize Interdependence. The elements of human design interact with and depend on the natural world, with broad and diverse implications at every scale. Expand design considerations to recognize even distant effects.
 Respect relationships between spirit and matter. Consider all aspects of human settlement including community, dwelling, industry, and trade in terms of existing and evolving connections between spiritual and material consciousness.
 Accept responsibility for the consequences of design decisions upon human well-being, the viability of natural systems, and their right to co-exist.
 Create safe objects of long-term value. Do not burden future generations with requirements for maintenance or vigilant administration of potential danger due to the careless creation of products, processes, or standards.
 Eliminate the concept of waste. Evaluate and optimize the full life-cycle of products and processes, to approach the state of natural systems in which there is no waste.
 Rely on natural energy flows. Human designs should, like the living world, derive their creative forces from perpetual solar income. Incorporating this energy efficiently and safely for responsible use.
 Understand the limitations of design. No human creation lasts forever and design does not solve all problems. Those who create and plan should practice humility in the face of nature. Treat nature as a model and mentor, not an inconvenience to be evaded or controlled.
 Seek constant improvement by the sharing of knowledge. Encourage direct and open communication between colleagues, patrons, manufacturers, and users to link long-term sustainable considerations with ethical responsibility, and re-establish the integral relationship between natural processes and human activity.

These principles were adopted by the World Congress of the International Union of Architects (UIA) in June 1993 at the American Institute of Architects (AIA) Expo 93 in Chicago. Further, the AIA and UIA signed a "Declaration of Interdependence for a Sustainable Future." In summary, the declaration states that today's society is degrading its environment and that the AIA, UIA, and their members are committed to:

 Placing environmental and social sustainability at the core of practices and professional responsibilities
 Developing and continually improving practices, procedures, products, services, and standards for sustainable design
 Educating the building industry, clients, and the general public about the importance of sustainable design
 Working to change policies, regulations, and standards in government and business so that sustainable design will become the fully supported standard practice
 Bringing the existing built environment up to sustainable design standards.

In addition, the Interprofessional Council on Environmental Design (ICED), a coalition of architectural, landscape architectural, and engineering organizations developed a vision statement in an attempt to foster a team approach to sustainable design. ICED states: The ethics, education, and practices of our professions will be directed to shape a sustainable future. . . . To achieve this vision we will join . . . as a multidisciplinary partnership."

These activities are an indication that the concept of sustainable design is being supported on a global and interprofessional scale and that the ultimate goal is to become more environmentally responsive. The world needs facilities that are more energy-efficient and that promote conservation and recycling of natural and economic resources.

Economic and Social Sustainable Design 
Environmentally sustainable design is most beneficial when it works hand-in-hand with the other two counterparts of sustainable design – the economic and socially sustainable designs. These three terms are often coined under the title ‘triple bottom line.’
It is imperative that we think about value in not solely economic or financial terms, but also in relation to natural capital (the biosphere and earth's resources), social capital (the norms and networks that enable collective action), and human capital (the sum total of knowledge, experience, intellectual property, and labor available to society). The purely economic capital so many people and organizations strive for, and make decisions by, are often not conducive to these alternative forms of capital. For sustainable design, there is a need to reset how we, as inhabitants of the earth, think about value.
In some countries the term sustainable design is known as ecodesign, green design or environmental design. Victor Papanek, embraced social design and social quality and ecological quality, but did not explicitly combine these areas of design concern in one term. Sustainable design and design for sustainability are more common terms, including the triple bottom line (people, planet and profit).

In the EU, the concept of sustainable design is referred to as ecodesign. Examples. Little discussions have taken place over the importance of this concept in the run-up to the circular economy package, that the European Commission will be tabling by the end of 2015. To this effect, an Ecothis.EU campaign was launched to raise awareness about the economic and environmental consequences of not including eco-design as part of the circular economy package.

Aspects of environmentally sustainable design

Emotionally durable design

According to Jonathan Chapman of Carnegie Mellon University, USA, emotionally durable design reduces the consumption and waste of natural resources by increasing the resilience of relationships established between consumers and products." Essentially, product replacement is delayed by strong emotional ties. In his book, Emotionally Durable Design: Objects, Experiences & Empathy, Chapman describes how "the process of consumption is, and has always been, motivated by complex emotional drivers, and is about far more than just the mindless purchasing of newer and shinier things; it is a journey towards the ideal or desired self, that through cyclical loops of desire and disappointment, becomes a seemingly endless process of serial destruction". Therefore, a product requires an attribute, or number of attributes, which extend beyond utilitarianism.

According to Chapman, 'emotional durability' can be achieved through consideration of the following five elements:
 Narrative: How users share a unique personal history with the product.
 Consciousness: How the product is perceived as autonomous and in possession of its own free will.
 Attachment: Can a user be made to feel a strong emotional connection to a product?
 Fiction: The product inspires interactions and connections beyond just the physical relationship.
 Surface: How the product ages and develops character through time and use.

As a strategic approach, "emotionally durable design provides a useful language to describe the contemporary relevance of designing responsible, well made, tactile products which the user can get to know and assign value to in the long-term." According to Hazel Clark and David Brody of Parsons The New School for Design in New York, “emotionally durable design is a call for professionals and students alike to prioritise the relationships between design and its users, as a way of developing more sustainable attitudes to, and in, design things.”

Beauty and sustainable design
Because standards of sustainable design appear to emphasize ethics over aesthetics, some designers and critics have complained that it lacks inspiration. Pritzker Architecture Prize winner Frank Gehry has called green building "bogus," and National Design Awards winner Peter Eisenman has dismissed it as "having nothing to do with architecture." In 2009, The American Prospect asked whether "well-designed green architecture" is an "oxymoron."

Others claim that such criticism of sustainable design is misguided. A leading advocate for this alternative view is architect Lance Hosey, whose book The Shape of Green: Aesthetics, Ecology, and Design (2012) was the first dedicated to the relationships between sustainability and beauty. Hosey argues not just that sustainable design needs to be aesthetically appealing in order to be successful, but also that following the principles of sustainability to their logical conclusion requires reimagining the shape of everything designed, creating things of even greater beauty. Reviewers have suggested that the ideas in The Shape of Green could "revolutionize what it means to be sustainable." Small and large buildings are beginning to successfully incorporate principles of sustainability into award-winning designs. Examples include One Central Park and the Science Faculty building, UTS.

The popular Living Building Challenge has incorporated beauty as one of its petals in building design. Sustainable products and processes are required to be beautiful because it allows for emotional durability, which increases the probability that they are going to be maintained and preserved, decreasing their carbon footprint. Many people also argue that biophilia is innately beautiful. Which is why building architecture is designed such that people feel close to nature and is often surrounded by well-kept lawns – a design that is both ‘beautiful’ and encourages the inculcation of nature in our daily lives. Or utilizes daylight design into the system – reducing lighting loads while also fulfilling our need for being close to that which is outdoors.

Economic Aspects
Discussed above, economics is another aspect of it environmental design that is crucial to most design decisions. It is obvious that most people consider the cost of any design before they consider the environmental impacts of it. Therefore, there is a growing nuance of pitching ideas and suggestions for environmentally sustainable design by highlighting the economical profits that they bring to us. 
"As the green design field matures, it becomes ever more clear that integration is the key to achieving energy and environmental goals especially if cost is a major driver." Building Green Inc. (1999)
To achieve the more ambitious goals of the green design movement, architects, engineers and designers need to further embrace and communicate the profit and economic potential of sustainable design measures. Focus should be on honing skills in communicating the economic and profit potential of smart design, with the same rigor that have been applied to advancing technical building solutions.

Standards of Evaluation

There are several standards and rating systems developed as sustainability gains popularity. Most rating systems revolve around buildings and energy, and some cover products as well. Most rating systems certify on the basis of design as well as post construction or manufacturing. 
LEED - Leadership in energy and environmental design. 
Living building challenge
HERS - Home energy rating
WELS rating - water efficiency labeling standard
BREEAM - Building Research Establishment's Environmental Assessment Method 
GBI - Green Building Initiative
EPA WaterSense
Energy Star
FSC - Forest Stewardship Council
CASBEE - Comprehensive Assessment System for Built Environment Efficiency
Passive house.

While designing for environmental sustainability, it is imperative that the appropriate units are paid attention to. Often, different standards weigh things in different units, and that can make a huge impact on the outcome of the project. 
Another important aspect of using standards and looking at data involves understanding the baseline. A poor design baseline with huge improvements often show a higher efficiency percentage, while an intelligent baseline from the start might only have a little improvement needed and show lesser change. Therefore, all data should ideally be compared on similar levels, and also be looked at from multiple unit values.

Greenwashing
Greenwashing is defined to be “the process of conveying a false impression or providing misleading information about how a company's products are more environmentally sound”. This can be as simple as using green packaging which subconsciously leads a consumer to think that a product is more environmentally friendly than others. Another example are eco-labels. Companies can take advantage of these certifications for appearance and profit, but their exact meanings are unclear and not readily available. Some labels are more credible than others as they are verified by a credible third-party, while others are self-awarded. The labels are badly regulated and prone to deception. This can lead people to make different decisions on the basis of potentially false narratives. These labels are highly effective as a study in Sweden found that a 32.8% of purchase behavior on ecological food can be determined by the presence of an eco-label. Increased transparency of these labels and recycling labels can empower consumers to make better choices.

LCA and Product Life

Life cycle assessment is the complete assessment of materials from their extraction, transport, processing, refining, manufacturing, maintenance, use, disposal, reuse and recycle stages. It helps put into perspective whether a design is actually environmentally sustainable in the long run. Products such as aluminum which can be reused multiple number of times but have a very energy intensive mining and refining which makes it unfavorable. Information such as this is done using LCA and then taken into consideration when designing.

Applications
Applications of this philosophy range from the microcosm — small objects for everyday use, through to the macrocosm — buildings, cities, and the Earth's physical surface. It is a philosophy that can be applied in the fields of architecture, landscape architecture, urban design, urban planning, engineering, graphic design, industrial design, interior design, fashion design and human-computer interaction.

Sustainable design is mostly a general reaction to global environmental crises, the rapid growth of economic activity and human population, depletion of natural resources, damage to ecosystems, and loss of biodiversity. In 2013, eco architecture writer Bridgette Meinhold surveyed emergency and long-term sustainable housing projects that were developed in response to these crises in her book, “Urgent Architecture: 40 Sustainable Housing Solutions for a Changing World.” Featured projects focus on green building, sustainable design, eco-friendly materials, affordability, material reuse, and humanitarian relief. Construction methods and materials include repurposed shipping containers, straw bale construction, sandbag homes, and floating homes.

The  limits of sustainable design are shrinking. Because growth in goods and services consistently outpaces gains in efficiency. As a result, the net effect of sustainable design has simply been to improve the efficiency of rapidly increasing impacts. This problem is not solved by the current approach, which focuses on the efficiency of delivering individual goods and services. The fundamental dilemmas are as follows: the increasing complexity of efficiency improvements; the difficulty of implementing new technologies in societies built around old ones; the fact that the physical impacts of delivering goods and services are not localized, but are distributed across economies; and the fact that the scale of resource use is growing and not stabilizing.

Sustainable architecture

Sustainable architecture is the design of sustainable buildings. Sustainable architecture attempts to reduce the collective environmental impacts during the production of building components, during the construction process, as well as during the lifecycle of the building (heating, electricity use, carpet cleaning etc.) This design practice emphasizes efficiency of heating and cooling systems; alternative energy sources such as solar hot water, appropriate building siting, reused or recycled building materials; on-site power generation - solar technology, ground source heat pumps, wind power; rainwater harvesting for gardening, washing and aquifer recharge; and on-site waste management such as green roofs that filter and control stormwater runoff. This requires close cooperation of the design team, the architects, the engineers, and the client at all project stages, from site selection, scheme formation, material selection and procurement, to project implementation. This is also called a charrette. 
Appropriate building siting and smaller building footprints are vital to an environmentally sustainable design. Oftentimes, a building may be very well designed, and energy efficient but its location requires people to travel far back and forth – increasing pollution that may not be building produced but is directly as a result of the building anyway. 
Sustainable architecture must also cover the building beyond its useful life. Its disposal or recycling aspects also come under the wing of sustainability. Often, modular buildings are better to take apart and less energy intensive to put together too. The waste from the demolition site must be disposed of correctly and everything that can be harvested and used again should be designed to be extricated from the structure with ease, preventing unnecessary wastage when decommissioning the building. 
Another important aspect of sustainable architecture stems from the question of whether a structure is needed. Sometimes the best that can be done to make a structure sustainable is retrofitting or upgrading the building services and supplies instead of tearing it down. Abu Dhabi, for example has undergone and is undergoing major retrofitting to slash its energy and water consumption rather than demolishing and rebuilding new structures.

Sustainable architects design with sustainable living in mind. Sustainable vs green design is the challenge that designs not only reflect healthy processes and uses but are powered by renewable energies and site specific resources. A test for sustainable design is — can the design function for its intended use without fossil fuel — unplugged. This challenge suggests architects and planners design solutions that can function without pollution rather than just reducing pollution.  As technology progresses in architecture and design theories and as examples are built and tested, architects will soon be able to create not only passive, null-emission buildings, but rather be able to integrate the entire power system into the building design.  In 2004 the 59 home housing community, the Solar Settlement, and a  integrated retail, commercial and residential building, the Sun Ship, were completed by architect Rolf Disch in Freiburg, Germany. The Solar Settlement is the first housing community worldwide in which every home, all 59, produce a positive energy balance.

An essential element of Sustainable Building Design is indoor environmental quality including air quality, illumination, thermal conditions, and acoustics. The integrated design of the indoor environment is essential and must be part of the integrated design of the entire structure. ASHRAE Guideline 10-2011 addresses the interactions among indoor environmental factors and goes beyond traditional standards.

Concurrently, the recent movements of New Urbanism and New Classical Architecture promote a sustainable approach towards construction, that appreciates and develops smart growth, architectural tradition and classical design. This in contrast to modernist and globally uniform architecture, as well as leaning against solitary housing estates and suburban sprawl. Both trends started in the 1980s. The Driehaus Architecture Prize is an award that recognizes efforts in New Urbanism and New Classical Architecture, and is endowed with a prize money twice as high as that of the modernist Pritzker Prize.

Green Design
Green design has often been used interchangeably with environmentally sustainable design. It is the practice of creating structures by using environment friendly processes. There is a popular debate about this with several arguing that green design is in effect narrower than sustainable design, which takes into account a larger system. Green design focuses on the short-term goals and while it is a worthy goal, a larger impact is possible using sustainable design. It is included in the process of creating a sustainable design. Another factor to be considered is that green design has been stigmatized by popular personalities such as Pritzker Architecture Prize winner Frank Gehry, but this branding hasn't reached sustainable design. A large part of that is because of how environmentally sustainable design is generally used hand in hand with economically sustainable design and socially sustainable design. Finally, green design is although unintentionally, often associated only with architecture while sustainable design has been considered under a much larger scope.

Engineering Design
Sustainable engineering is the process of designing or operating systems such that they use energy and resources sustainably, in other words, at a rate that does not compromise the natural environment, or the ability of future generations to meet their own needs.
Common engineering focuses revolve around water supply, production, sanitation, cleaning up of pollution and waste sites, restoring natural habitats etc.

Sustainable Interior Design
Achieving a healthy and aesthetic environment for the occupants of a space is one of the basic rules in the art of Interior design. When applying focus onto the sustainable aspects of the art, Interior Design can incorporate the study and involvement of functionality, accessibility, and aesthetics to environmentally friendly materials. The integrated design of the indoor environment is essential and must be part of the integrated design of the entire structure.

Goals of Sustainable Interior Design 
Improving the overall building performance through the reduction of negative impacts on the environment is the primary goal. According to the Environmental Protection Agency (EPA), Americans spend approximately 90% of their time indoors, where the concentrations of some toxins and impurities are frequently two to five times higher than they are outside. Sustainable interior design solutions strive to create truly inspirational rooms while simultaneously enhancing indoor air quality and mitigating the environmental impact of interior design procedures. This requires interior designers to make ethical design choices and include environmental concerns into their work, as interiors and the environment are closely intertwined.

Reducing consumption of non-renewable resources, minimizing waste and creating healthy, productive environments are the primary objectives of sustainability. Optimizing site potential, minimizing non-renewable energy consumption, using environmentally preferable products, protecting and conserving water, enhancing indoor environmental quality, and optimizing operational and maintenance practices are some of the primary principles. An essential element of Sustainable Building Design is indoor environmental quality including air quality, illumination, thermal conditions, and acoustic. Interior design, when done correctly, can harness the true power of sustainable architecture.

Incorporating Sustainable Interior Design 
Sustainable Interior Design can be incorporated through various techniques: water efficiency, energy efficiency, using non-toxic, sustainable or recycled materials, using manufactured processes and producing products with more energy efficiency, building longer lasting and better functioning products, designing reusable and recyclable products, following the sustainable design standards and guidelines, and more. For example, a room with large windows to allow for maximum sunlight should have neutral colored interiors to help bounce the light around and increase comfort levels while reducing light energy requirement. The size should, however, be carefully considered to avoid window glare.

Interior Designers must take types of paints, adhesives, and more into consideration during their designing and manufacturing phase so they do not contribute to harmful environmental factors. Choosing whether to use a wood floor to marble tiled floor or carpeted floor can reduce energy consumption by the level of insulation that they provide. Utilizing materials that can withhold 24-hour health care facilities, such as linoleum, scrubbable cotton wall coverings, recycled carpeting, low toxic adhesive, and more.

Furthermore, incorporating sustainability can begin before the construction process begins. Purchasing items from sustainable local businesses, analyzing the longevity of a product, taking part in recycling by purchasing recycled materials, and more should be taken into consideration. Supporting local, sustainable businesses is the first step, as this not only increases the demand for sustainable products, but also reduces unsustainable methods. Traveling all over to find specific products or purchasing products from over seas contributes to carbon emissions in the atmosphere, pulling further away from the sustainable aspect. Once the products are found, it is important to check if the selection follows the Cradle-to-cradle design (C2C) method and they are also able to be reclaimed, recycled, and reused. Also paying close attention to energy-efficient products during this entire process contributes to the sustainability factors. The aesthetic of a space does not have to be sacrificed in order to achieve sustainable interior design. Every environment and space can incorporate materials and choices to reducing environmental impact, while still providing durability and functionality.

Promotion of Sustainable Interior Design 
The mission to incorporate sustainable interior design into every aspect of life is slowly becoming a reality. The commercial Interior Design Association (IIDA) created the sustainability forum to encourage, support, and educate the design community and the public about sustainability. The Athena Sustainable Materials Institute ensures enabling smaller footprints by working with sustainability leaders in various ways in producing and consuming materials. Building Green considers themselves the most trusted voice for sustainable and healthy design, as they offer a variety of resources to dive deep into sustainability. Various acts, such as the Energy Policy Act (EPAct) of 2005 and the Energy Independence and Security Act (EISA) of 2007 have been revised and passed to achieve better efforts towards sustainable design. Federal efforts, such as the signing of a Memorandum of Understanding to the commitment of sustainable design and the Executive Order 13693 have also worked to achieve these concepts. Various guideline and standard documents have been published for the sake of sustainable interior design and companies like LEED (Leadership in Energy and Environmental Design) are guiding and certifying efforts put into motion to contribute to the mission. When the thought of incorporating sustainable design into an interior's design is kept as a top goal for a designer, creating an overall healthy and environmentally friendly space can be achieved.

Global Examples of Sustainable Interior Design 

 Proximity Hotel in North Carolina, United States of America: The Proximity Hotel was the first hotel to be granted the LEED Platinum certification from the U.S. Green Building Council.
 Shanghai Natural History Museum in Shanghai, China: This new museum incorporates evaporative cooling and maintained temperatures through is design and structure.
 Vancouver Convention Centre West in Vancouver, British Columbia, Canada: The West location of the Vancouver Convention Centre was the first convention center in the world to be granted LEED Platinum.
 Bullitt Center in Seattle, Washington, United States of America: Considered "The Greenest Commercial Building in the World," it is the first to achieve the Living Building Challenge certification.
 Sydney, Australia became the first city in the country to contribute Green roof and Green wall to their architecture following their "Sustainable Sydney 2030" set of goals.

Sustainable urban planning

Sustainable design of cities is the task of designing and planning the outline of cities such that they have a low carbon footprint, have better air quality, rely on more sustainable sources of energy, and have a healthy relationship with the environment. Sustainable urban planning involves many disciplines, including architecture, engineering, biology, environmental science, materials science, law, transportation, technology, economic development, accounting and finance, and government, among others. This kind of planning also develops innovative and practical approaches to land use and its impact on natural resources.
New sustainable solutions for urban planning problems can include green buildings and housing, mixed-use developments, walkability, greenways and open spaces, alternative energy sources such as solar and wind, and transportation options. Good sustainable land use planning helps improve the welfare of people and their communities, shaping their urban areas and neighborhoods into healthier, more efficient spaces. Design and planning of neighbourhoods are a major challenge when creating a favourable urban environment. The challenge is based on the principles of integrated approach to different demands: social, architectural, artistic, economic, sanitary and hygienic. Social demands are aimed at constructing network and placing buildings in order to create favourable conditions for their convenient use. Architectural-artistic solutions are aimed at single spatial composition of an area with the surrounding landscape. Economic demands include rational utilization of area territories. Sanitary and hygienic demands are of more interest in terms of creating sustainable urban areas.

Sustainable landscape and garden design

Sustainable landscape architecture is a category of sustainable design and energy-efficient landscaping concerned with the planning and design of outdoor space. Plants and materials may be bought from local growers to reduce energy used in transportation.
Design techniques include planting trees to shade buildings from the sun or protect them from wind, using local materials, and on-site composting and chipping not only to reduce green waste hauling but to increase organic matter and therefore carbon in the soil.

Some designers and gardeners such as Beth Chatto also use drought-resistant plants in arid areas (xeriscaping) and elsewhere so that water is not taken from local landscapes and habitats for irrigation. Water from building roofs may be collected in rain gardens so that the groundwater is recharged, instead of rainfall becoming surface runoff and increasing the risk of flooding.

Areas of the garden and landscape can also be allowed to grow wild to encourage bio-diversity. Native animals may also be encouraged in many other ways: by plants which provide food such as nectar and pollen for insects, or roosting or nesting habitats such as trees, or habitats such as ponds for amphibians and aquatic insects. Pesticides, especially persistent pesticides, must be avoided to avoid killing wildlife.

Soil fertility can be managed sustainably by the use of many layers of vegetation from trees to ground-cover plants and mulches to increase organic matter and therefore earthworms and mycorrhiza; nitrogen-fixing plants instead of synthetic nitrogen fertilizers; and sustainably harvested seaweed extract to replace micronutrients.

Sustainable landscapes and gardens can be productive as well as ornamental, growing food, firewood and craft materials from beautiful places.

Sustainable landscape approaches and labels include organic farming and growing, permaculture, agroforestry, forest gardens, agroecology, vegan organic gardening, ecological gardening and climate-friendly gardening.

Sustainable agriculture

Sustainable agriculture adheres to three main goals:
Environmental health,
Economic profitability,
Social and economic equity.
A variety of philosophies, policies and practices have contributed to these goals. People in many different capacities, from farmers to consumers, have shared this vision and contributed to it. Despite the diversity of people and perspectives, the following themes commonly weave through definitions of sustainable agriculture.

There are strenuous discussions — among others by the agricultural sector and authorities — if existing pesticide protocols and methods of soil conservation adequately protect topsoil and wildlife. Doubt has risen if these are sustainable, and if agrarian reforms would permit an efficient agriculture with fewer pesticides, therefore reducing the damage to the ecosystem.

Energy sector

Sustainable technology in the energy sector is based on utilizing renewable sources of energy such as solar, wind, hydro, bioenergy, geothermal, and hydrogen. Wind energy is the world's fastest growing energy source; it has been in use for centuries in Europe and more recently in the United States and other nations. Wind energy is captured through the use of wind turbines that generate and transfer electricity for utilities, homeowners and remote villages. Solar power can be harnessed through photovoltaics, concentrating solar, or solar hot water and is also a rapidly growing energy source. Advancements in the technology and modifications to photovoltaics cells provide a more in depth untouched method for creating and producing solar power. Researchers have found a potential way to use the photogalvanic effect to transform sunlight into electric energy.

The availability, potential, and feasibility of primary renewable energy resources must be analyzed early in the planning process as part of a comprehensive energy plan. The plan must justify energy demand and supply and assess the actual costs and benefits to the local, regional, and global environments. Responsible energy use is fundamental to sustainable development and a sustainable future. Energy management must balance justifiable energy demand with appropriate energy supply. The process couples energy awareness, energy conservation, and energy efficiency with the use of primary renewable energy resources.

Water sector

Sustainable water technologies have become an important industry segment with several companies now providing important and scalable solutions to supply water in a sustainable manner.

Beyond the use of certain technologies, Sustainable Design in Water Management also consists very importantly in correct implementation of concepts. Among these principal concepts is the fact normally in developed countries 100% of water destined for consumption, that is not necessarily for drinking purposes, is of potable water quality. This concept of differentiating qualities of water for different purposes has been called "fit-for-purpose". This more rational use of water achieves several economies, that are not only related to water itself, but also the consumption of energy, as to achieve water of drinking quality can be extremely energy intensive for several reasons.

Domestic machinery and furniture

Automobiles, home appliances and furnitures can be designed for repair and disassembly (for recycling), and constructed from recyclable materials such as steel, aluminum and glass, and renewable materials, such as wood and plastics from natural feedstocks. Careful selection of materials and manufacturing processes can often create products comparable in price and performance to non-sustainable products. Even mild design efforts can greatly increase the sustainable content of manufactured items.

Improvements to heating, cooling, ventilation and water heating

 Absorption refrigerator
 Annualized geothermal solar
 Earth cooling tubes
 Geothermal heat pump
 Heat recovery ventilation
 Hot water heat recycling
 Passive cooling
 Renewable heat
 Seasonal thermal energy storage (STES)
 Solar air conditioning
 Solar hot water
 Superinsulation

Design for sustainable manufacturing
Sustainable manufacturing can be defined as the creation of a manufactured product through a concurrent improvement in the resulting effect on factory and product sustainability. The concept of sustainable manufacturing demands a renewed design of production systems in order to condition the related sustainability on product life cycle and Factory operations.
 Designing sustainable production systems imply, on the one hand, the analysis and optimization of intra-factory aspects that are related to manufacturing plants. Such aspects can regard the resource consumption restrain, the process efficiency, the ergonomics for the factory workers, the elimination of hazardous substances, the minimization of factory emissions and waste as well as internal emissions, the integrated management of information in the production facilities, and the technological updating of machines and plants.
 Other inter-factories aspects concern the sustainable design of manufactured products, product chain dematerialisation, management of the background and foreground supply chains, support of circular economy paradigm, and the labelling for sustainability.
Advantageous reasons for why companies might choose to sustainably manufacture either their products or use a sustainable manufacturing process are:
Increase operational efficiency by reducing costs and waste
Respond to or reach new customers and increase competitive advantage
Protect and strengthen brand and reputation and build public trust
Build long-term business viability and success
Respond to regulatory constraints and opportunities

Sustainable technologies
Sustainable technologies use less energy, fewer limited resources, do not deplete natural resources, do not directly or indirectly pollute the environment, and can be reused or recycled at the end of their useful life. They may also be technology that help identify areas of growth by giving feedback in terms of data or alerts allowed to be analyzed to improve environmental footprints. There is significant overlap with appropriate technology, which emphasizes the suitability of technology to the context, in particular considering the needs of people in developing countries. The most appropriate technology may not be the most sustainable one; and a sustainable technology may have high cost or maintenance requirements that make it unsuitable as an "appropriate technology," as that term is commonly used.

“Technology is deeply entrenched in our society; without it, society would immediately collapse. Moreover, technological changes can be perceived as easier to accomplish than lifestyle changes that might be required to solve the problems that we face.”
The design of sustainable technology relies heavily on the flow of new information. Sustainable technology such as smart metering systems and intelligent sensors reduce energy consumption and help conserve water. These systems are ones that have more fundamental changes, rather than just switching to simple sustainable designs. Such designing requires constant updates and evolutions, to ensure true environmental sustainability, because the concept of sustainability is ever changing – with regards to our relationship with the environment. A large part of designing sustainable technology involves giving control to the users for their comfort and operation. For example, dimming controls help people adjust the light levels to their comfort. Sectioned lighting and lighting controls let people manipulate their lighting needs without worrying about affecting others – therefore reducing lighting loads.

Innovation and development
The precursor step to environmentally sustainable development must be a sustainable design. By definition, design is defined as purpose, planning, or intention that exists or is thought to exist behind an action, fact, or material object. Development utilizes design and executes it, helping areas, cities, or places to advance. Sustainable development is that development which adheres to the values of sustainability and provide for the society without endangering the ecosystem and its services. “Without development, design is useless. Without design, development is unusable.” – Florian Popescu, How to bridge the gap between design and development.

Eco-innovation is the design and development of products and processes that contribute to sustainable development, applying the commercial application of knowledge to elicit direct or indirect ecological improvements. This includes a range of related ideas, from environmentally friendly technological advances to socially acceptable innovative paths towards sustainability. WIPO GREEN is an online global marketplace for technology exchange connecting providers and seekers of inventions and innovations in sustainable technology innovations.

Several factors drive design innovation in the environmental sphere. These include growing consumer awareness and demand for green products and services, development and (re)discovery of renewable materials, sustainable refurbishment, new technologies for manufacturing and growing use of artificial intelligence-based tools based to map needs and identify areas for improved efficiency.

Whatever the industry or product, design rights (whether registered or unregistered) can harness innovative design. Design rights (known as design patents in some jurisdictions) are widely used to protect everything from marketing logos and packaging to the shape of furniture and vehicles and the user interfaces of computers and smartphones. Design rights are available in many jurisdictions and through regional systems. Protection can also be obtained internationally using the WIPO-administered Hague System for the International Registration of Designs.

See also

 Active daylighting
 Bright green environmentalism
 Building Information Modeling
 Building services engineering
 Circles of Sustainability
 Climate-friendly gardening
 Cool roof
 Cradle to Cradle
 Daylighting
 Earth embassy
 Ecodistrict
 Ecological Restoration
 Ecosa Institute
 Ecosystem services
 Energy plus house
 Green chemistry
 Green transport
 Healthy building
 Landscape ecology
 Leadership in Energy and Environmental Design
 List of energy storage projects
 List of low-energy building techniques
 Metadesign
 Principles of Intelligent Urbanism
 Source reduction
 Sustainable art
 Terreform ONE
 Urban vitality
 Vertical garden
 Zero energy building

References